WZUM (1590 AM) was a radio station in Carnegie, Pennsylvania. WZUM was owned by Sovereign City Radio Services LLC.

History

After originally being awarded as WCNE but changing calls to WZUM before being licensed in 1964, the station signed on as an R&B and top 40 station, partly owned by popular Pittsburgh polka bandleader James Psihoulis "Jimmy Pol". During the 1970s, WZUM was a freeform AOR outlet from 10:00 a.m. until sunset, (broadcasting polkas in the morning from sunrise).  "Powerful" Paul Perry, son of Pittsburgh TV personality Nick Perry, was one of the freeform disc jockeys; along with Kit Baron, "Laid Back" Larry Allen and Mark Wallace.  WZUM switched to religious programming under the WPLW callsign in 1975 after its purchase by Robert Hickling. In 1998, following Hickling's death, it was sold to Pittsburgh-area broadcaster Mike Horvath and returned to WZUM, changing to smooth jazz, but went dark after just one year with the format. The station later returned after a major transmitter and studio overhaul with time-brokered programming, then oldies, with Catholic programming added in 2002.  Upon purchase of the station, Starboard converted it to 100% Catholic programming under the Relevant Radio branding.
In recent years, WZUM applied for an upgrade to its signal, which would have given the station minimal night power.

Relevant Radio would cease programming on WZUM by early 2009. In its place, WZUM aired an Easy Listening format, and was in talks with the Delmarva Educational Association, an owner of a small group of religious stations in Virginia and Florida, for a more stable format or possible sale.

By May 23, 2009, the station dropped its easy listening format for Gospel and picked up the branding "1590 WZUM, The Promise".

The station ceased operations in March 2010, with the FCC approving a special temporary authority a month later for the station to remain silent. The station's license was cancelled by the FCC on May 29, 2013.

References

External links
FCC Station Search Details: DWZUM (Facility ID: 27137)
FCC History Cards for WZUM (covering 1957-1981 as WCNE / WZUM / WPLW)

ZUM
Radio stations established in 1964
Radio stations disestablished in 2010
Defunct radio stations in the United States
Defunct religious radio stations in the United States
1964 establishments in Pennsylvania
2010 disestablishments in Pennsylvania
ZUM